Gann Church ruin (Swedish: Ganns Ödekyrka) is the ruin of an abandoned church (ödekyrka) in Lärbro socken on the Swedish island of Gotland.  The stone church was built in the 13th century and  presumed abandoned in the 16th century.

History
The stone church structure consists of a chancel, nave and tower. The tower rests on the west wall of the nave. The tower was presumably built in the late 13th century. The church was presumably abandoned as early as in the 16th century. The chancel and arch contain mural paintings.
The church grounds and gardens were preserved in 1924 and are now a tourist destination.

Gallery

See also

List of church ruins on Gotland

References

External links 
 Geographic.org

Related reading
Lagerlöf, Erland (1973) Gotlands kyrkor (Uddevalla: Rabén & Sjögren)  
Andrén, Anders (2011)  Det Medeltida Gotland. En arkeologisk guidebok (Lund: Historiska Media)  
Ruins in Sweden
Church ruins in Sweden
Buildings and structures in Gotland County
12th-century churches in Sweden
Buildings and structures demolished in the 16th century